Granulifusus bacciballus is a species of sea snail, a marine gastropod mollusk in the family Fasciolariidae, the spindle snails, the tulip snails and their allies.

Description
The length of the shell attains 25.8 mm.

Distribution
This marine species occurs off New Caledonia.

References

bacciballus
Gastropods described in 2005